The Grès d'Alet is a Campanian geologic formation in southern France. Fossil dinosaur eggs have been reported from the formation.

See also 
 List of dinosaur-bearing rock formations
 List of stratigraphic units with dinosaur trace fossils
 Dinosaur eggs

References

Bibliography 
  

Geologic formations of France
Upper Cretaceous Series of Europe
Cretaceous France
Campanian Stage
Sandstone formations
Ooliferous formations